The Bronze Medal of Military Valor is an Italian medal for gallantry.

It was established by Charles Albert of Sardinia on 26 March 1833, along with the higher ranking Gold and Silver Medals for Military valor.

These medals, as well as the "Croce di Guerra al Valor Militare" (War Cross of Military Valor - which can only be awarded in time of war) are established by the Royal Decree of 4 November 1932, in which their purpose is defined as "To distinguish and publicly honor the authors of heroic military acts, even ones performed in time of peace, provided that the exploit is closely connected with the purposes for which the Armed Forces are constituted, whatever may be the condition or quality of the author."

During the First World War, the medal was given out some 60,244 times for individual acts of heroism (compared to 38,614 Silver medals and 368 Gold Medals).

Notable recipients
Ernesto Burzagli
William W. Eagles
Maurizio Giglio
Hans-Werner Kraus
Arthur Scott
Pedro del Valle
Franco Cesana

See also
 Medal of Military Valor
 Gold Medal of Military Valor
 Silver Medal of Military Valor
 List of military decorations
Italian medals 1860-today (Italian Wikipedia)

References 

Military awards and decorations of Italy
Courage awards